Grachi was a Spanish language American fantasy series produced by Nickelodeon created by Mariela Romero. The series stars Isabella Castillo as Grachi and Andrés Mercado as Daniel; also featuring and Kimberly Dos Ramos, Mauricio Henao, Sol Rodríguez and Lance Dos Ramos in supporting roles. The series was filmed in Miami, Florida, United States, becoming the first Nickelodeon Latin American series to be recorded out of Latin America, and also the first to be recorded on high definition. It premiered in Nickelodeon Latin America on May 2, 2011. In June 2011, it was confirmed that the series was renewed for a second season, which began airing on February 27, 2012. In June 2012, the series was renewed for a third and last season of 50 episodes, which aired from March 4 to May 10, 2013.

The series had an amazingly big success since it began, considered one of the 50 most talked about and cataloged series in Latin America, it won more than 47 awards. It is also Nickelodeon's highest debut (in general) gaining 10.7 million viewers on its premiere, surpassing the 6.8 million viewers that had the before record holder Big Time Rush.

The series follows the adventures of a teenage girl who, while adjusting to a new town, new school, rivalry, love and the everyday problems of being a teenager, discovers she has magical powers.

In January 2012, the series was dubbed to English and aired through Nickelodeon Philippines. Season 1 aired from January 16, 2012, to April 27, 2012, followed by season 2 one year later, from May 6, 2013, to September 11, 2013. Season 3 of Grachi never aired in the Philippines even though it had huge success because Nickelodeon Asia decided to start airing the 2014 English adaptation, Every Witch Way. In the United States, season 1 was aired from February 3 to May 15, 2014, but episodes was aired in Spanish through Azteca America. Grachi was also dubbed to English to be aired on Africa and subtitled for the Spanglish speaking viewers internationally.

Grachi is Nickelodeon Latin America's most successful series and one of the most successful live action series in general ever made by Nickelodeon.

Summary

Season 1
The season centers on Grachi (Isabella Castillo), a witch and a new student in Escolarium. She deals with using her magic and trying to find out how to defeat the Principal (an evil witch who tries to steal the powers of Grachi so she can be the most powerful witch). Grachi also deals with her rival, Matilda (Kimberly Dos Ramos) with whom she fights for the love of Daniel (Andrés Mercado). At the end of the season, Matilda celebrates her 16th birthday at the night of the eclipse while the Principal (Martha Pabon) and Sibilo (William Valdes) plan to steal the powers of Matilda and Grachi. The two girls team up and fight the Principal, turning her into a dog, but losing their powers. Matilda finally realizes that Grachi and Daniel are meant to be together.

Season 2
A dark witch, Mía Novoa (Maria Gabriela de Faria), who uses her power to do bad, enrolls in Escolarium. Mía is in love with Daniel and Grachi will do anything to fight for their love. Also, a geek named Leo falls in love with Grachi. On the other hand, Matilda starts dating Diego, a Kanay whom she has an on and off relationship due to Matilda's obsession with her powers and her witch instincts. At the end of the season, Grachi and Matilda's parents get married, thus making them stepsisters. Also, both witches teamed up to protect the wedding from an angered Leo, Mía, and Athena, a witch in love with Grachi's father Francisco. Also, with the exception of Daniel and Mecha, Grachi and Matilda erases everyone's memories about the events that happened, including Mía.

Season 3
Grachi enrolls in the School of Magic, where she meets a new love-interest and main antagonist, Axel, a mischievous kanay. Grachi and Axel share a dream about a mysterious necklace; in the meantime, Mía's memory is restored, thus plotting a revenge plan against Grachi, while Tony wants revenge on Grachi for not loving him back.

Background
The show was produced by Nickelodeon Latin America and written by Venezuela author Mariela Romero, who also created the teen novela Isa TKM. Tatiana Rodriguez commented that:

The program uses advanced production technology and 3D effects under the management of production house Aisha Enterprises, Inc. The executive producers are Solange Rivero and Yuldor Gutierrez.

Cast

Main

 Isabella Castillo as Graciela "Grachi" Alonso – A new 16-year-old student at Escolarium, she is a very powerful witch who has inherited her powers from her late mother. At the beginning of season one, she moves to a new neighborhood with her father Francisco, who is the new math professor at Escolarium. Her best friend is Mecha, while she is in love with Daniel. During the second season, Grachi gets a new enemy named Mía, a witch who is determined to steal Daniel's love from her. At the end of the second season, Grachi's powers get stronger, enough to defeat Mía. During the third season, she has a new love interest who is also her enemy, Axel.
 Andrés Mercado as Daniel Esquivel – The leader of the swimming team "The Sharks" at Escolarium. He's Chema's cousin and best friend. Daniel's parents are Cristina and Ricardo, and he has three siblings: Melanie, Luis and Roberto. He's introduced as Matilda's boyfriend and the most popular boy in the school, who every girl wants to be with. He and Grachi start a relationship during the first season's last episodes. In season two, he and Leo become enemies, because both want to be with Grachi. During the third season, Daniel befriends Leo, as he faces a new enemy, Axel.
 Kimberly Dos Ramos as Matilda Román (Seasons 1–2) – She's the main antagonist of the first season and was the most popular girl at Escolarium before Grachi's arrival. She is also a witch but uses her powers to do bad. She is the leader of the "Red Panthers", a group of girls who dance and respond to all of Matilda's manipulations. Matilda is Daniel's ex-girlfriend, and she is determined to win his love back and destroy Grachi. During the second season, she began dating a new guy named Diego. She and Grachi developed a slight friendship during the season and became stepsisters at the end due to Ursula and Francisco's wedding. Matilda doesn't return for the third season.
Rafael de la Fuente as Diego Forlán – Part of "The Sharks", Matilda's boyfriend in season two and a Kanay, a person who can manipulate the four elements. He was a minor character during the first season and got a prominent role during the following ones. In the third season, he falls in love with Axel's sister, Amaya, and she becomes his girlfriend at the end of the third season.
Mauricio Henao as Antonio "Tony" Gordillo – A highly intelligent and nerdy boy who falls in love with Grachi, but his affections aren't reciprocated. He joins the swimming team "The Sharks". At the end of the first season, Tony wins a scholarship to study at a better school and leaves Escolarium in search of new opportunities. He returns for the second and third season as a guest star, revealing he's a wizard. During the second season, he doesn't wear his glasses anymore, and has a more mature look. During the third season, he becomes an antagonist, trying to destroy Grachi for not loving him back, but he is locked up in a magical powder box by Axel.
Sol Rodríguez as Mercedes "Mecha" Estevez – Grachi's best friend, daughter of Lolo. She hates Matilda, but is stuck living in the same house as her because Lolo works for Ursula, Matilda's mother. Mecha is in love with Chema. In season 2, she moves out of Matilda's mansion with her mother. She also dislikes Mía but becomes her guardian after finding out that the evil witches are the ones who have guardians, while the good witches only have magical tutors to guide them. In the third season, she falls in love with Manú.
Lance Dos Ramos as José María "Chema" Esquivel (Seasons 1–2) – Daniel's cousin and best friend, part of "The Sharks". Chema's parents are artists who tour most of the time, so Chema lives with his uncle Ricardo and aunt Cristina and his four cousins. He is in love with Mecha. He doesn't appear in the third season.
Maria Gabriela de Faría as Mía Novoa (Seasons 2–3) – The new witch at Escolarium and Grachi's enemy in the second season. She falls in love with Daniel right away, but her love is not reciprocated. In the last episode of the second season, she tries to destroy Grachi's father and Matilda's mother wedding for revenge. She is later enchanted and loses her memory. During season three, she takes her memory back and tries to take revenge, but in the end she befriends Grachi.
Willy Martin as Leonardo "Leo" Martinez (Seasons 2–3) – An intelligent and creative guy who uses science to create his own magic. He has a crush on Grachi and hates Daniel. During the third season, he befriends Daniel and starts a relationship with his best friend Valeria.
Danilo Carrera as Axel Vélez (Seasons 2–3) – A wizard at the school of witchcraft, he is Amaya's brother, Erick's son and Mía's ex-boyfriend. He's the villain of the third season and uses his power to do misdeeds. He is sent to the past in the season's last episode by Daniel through the collar.
Jesús Neyra as Manú (Season 3) – used to be Axel's best friend and sidekick. He falls in love with Mecha, and later becomes part of the heroes and Mecha's boyfriend.
Katie Barberi as Úrsula – Matilda's mother and Francisco's wife. She accidentally obtained Matilda's powers during the final episode of the first season and the first ones of the second one. She gets closer to Grachi and Francisco during the second season. She marries Francisco at the end of the season. Note: Barberi also played Ursula (Maddie Van Pelt's mom) in Every Witch Way.
Ramiro Fumazoni as Francisco Alonso – Grachi's father and, later, new principal of the Escolarium and Úrsula's husband.
Sharlene Taulé as Katty – Co-leader of the "Red Panthers" and Matilda's sidekick. Dotty and Betty's best friend.
María del Pilar Pérez as Dotty – Member of the "Red Panthers" and Matilda's sidekick. Katty and Betty's.
Carlos Arrechea aka Carlo Arrechea as Sebastian (Seasons 1–3) – Member of "The Sharks", the popular swimming team from Escolarium. He's funny and likes to be the center of attention, burps all the time specially on season 3. His nickname is "El Tiburón Peligroso" (The dangerous shark). He always wants to be the best. His best friend is Carlos. He is intelligent, naive and a good athlete.
Alexandra Pomales as Betty (Season 1) – Member of the "Red Panthers" and Matilda's sidekick. Betty transfers to a different school during the first season.
Cristian Campocasso as Luis Esquivel – Daniel's younger brother.
Evaluna Montaner as Melanie Esquivel (Seasons 1–2) – Daniel's younger sister. Like her brothers, she likes Grachi and wants her to be Daniel's girlfriend.
Andrés Cotrino as Roberto Esquivel (Seasons 1–2) – Daniel's younger brother.
Liannet Borrego as Cussy Canosa (Season 1) – Julio's girlfriend, secretary in Escolarium and Grachi's magic tutor.
Lino Martone as Julio Vallas (Season 1) – Cussy's boyfriend, and the son of the Principal. He used to be "The Sharks" team coach, but later resigned during the second season.

Recurring
Marisela González as Lolo (Seasons 1–2) – Mecha's mother and Úrsula's personal assistant only in season one. In season two, she leaves Úrsula's house and goes to an apartment with her daughter Mecha. She was the guardian of Ora.
William Valdes as Sibilo/Ora Santisteban (Season 1) – Lolo's ring, former wizard and Oracle.
Adriana Cataño as Cristina de Esquivel (Seasons 1–2) – Daniel's mother.
Manuel Carrillo as Ricardo Esquivel – Daniel's father.
Virginia Nuñez as Kim Kanay(Seasons 2–3) – Diego's friend and a Kanay.
Martha Pabón as Mrs. Director (Season 1) – Principal of Escolarium and main antagonist in season one.
Nicole Apollonio as Diana (Season 1–2) – Friend of Melanie and Guillermo's sister.
Raquel Rojas as Rosa Forlán – Leader of the pink gossips, Diego's sister and also Guillermo's girlfriend during the second and third season.
Wendy Regalado as Lucía – Member of the pink gossips. She is in love with Tony.
Erika Navarro as Veronica (Season 1) – Member of the pink gossips.
Andreina Santander as Marta (Season 1) – Member of the pink gossips.
Elizabeth Lazo as Carolina (Season 1) – Member of the pink gossips.
Angela Rincon as Silvia – Member of the pink gossips.
Ana Carolina Grajales as Valeria (Seasons 2–3) – Member of the pink gossips. Leo's assistant and girlfriend in season three. She's Amaya's clone.
Ana Carolina Grajales as Amaya Vélez (Season 3) – A new witch in the third season. Axel's sister, Mía's best friend, she falls in love with Diego, who is a Kanay and currently is her boyfriend at the end of the third season. 
Guilherme Apollonio as Guillermo – Member of "The Sharks". He had a crush on Grachi only in the first season. Diego's best friend and Rosa's boyfriend during the second and third season.
Tony Hernandez as Carlos – Member of "The Sharks".
Jesus Licciardello as Eduardo (Season 1) – Dotty's lizard which was temporarily turned human by Matilda.
Alex Rosguer as Miguel (Season 1–2) – Leader of "The Dolphins" and Daniel's rival. He has a much bigger role during the second season, trying to take Grachi away from Daniel.
Paloma Marquez as Isadora (Season 1) – Dance teacher at Escolarium.
Yosvany Morales as Teacher of Chemistry (Season 1) – Teacher at Escolarium.
Francisco Chacin as Fernando Gordillo – Tony's father and worker of the Cafeteria at Escolarium.
Diana Osorio as Alejandra Forlán (Season 2) – She is the new coach of "The Sharks", and she is the sister of Diego and Rosa.
Juan Pablo Llano as Ignacio "Nacho" Novoa (Season 2) – Mia's brother. He is the new coach of "The Dolphins" in season two and is in love with Alejandra.

Episodes

TV specials

Wonderfully Magical Story
Wonderfully Magical Story is the first special of the series, which premiered on May 2, 2011, before the release of the series. This special was a presentation of the characters and the content of the series. It only showed the first season presentation. It has been released on April 28, 2011.

Unpublished episode
This is a TV special containing some deleted scenes. It has been released on August 19, 2011. Principally, the episode focuses on Diego and his powers.

Quiero Mis 16
It's a fictional story, set during the preparations for Matilda's sixteenth birthday. It has been released on August 25, 2011.

Music

Life's Wonderfully Magical, Volume 1
The soundtrack of the first season was released in Latin America on June 7, 2011. The album includes 14 songs used in the series sang mostly by Isabella Castillo, some others of the cast and Latin artists. The simple theme of the series was released on April 1, 2011, with its accompanying video. The second single from the album, Tu Eres Para Mi, was released on July 21, 2011. Distributed by Universal Music and Warner Music. A live concert tour was created to promote the album in North America, South America and Europe. The album peaked No. 1 in Mexico and achivied a diamond certification in that country.

Life's Wonderfully Magical, Volume 2
The second soundtrack was released on April 11, 2012, in Latin America and it contains the season 2 songs, this time all sang by the entire cast from the series. Distributed by Warner Music. A live concert tour was created to promote the album in North America, South America and Europe. The song "Lagrimas" won a Latin Grammy nomination. This album peaked No. 1 in 14 countries.

Soñar No Cuesta Nada
On March 21, 2013, Warner Music signed Nickelodeon Latin American star Isabella Castillo. The album served as the soundtrack of the third season, still Nickelodeon released also another third season soundtrack with different artists digitally. Soñar No Cuesta Nada was released on Latin America on April 23, 2013. This album peaked No. 14 in the Billboard Latin Hot 100. This also contains a new version of the Latin Grammy nominated song from Grachi season 2 "Lagrimas".

Awards and nominations

International broadcasts
In the Philippines, Grachi started to air on January 16, 2012, on Nickelodeon, Monday to Friday at its original timeslot, 5:30 pm. Also, catch-up episodes aired every Saturday and Sunday at 5:30 p.m. until 9:00 pm. Season 1 ended on April 27, 2012. One year later, Season 1 catch-up episodes aired again on Saturday, March 9, 2013, at 5:30 p.m. until 9:00 p.m. and continued every Saturday and Sunday until Season 2 eventually aired on May 6, 2013, at its new timeslot, 7:30 pm. Unlike in Season 1, no catch-up episodes were aired on Saturday and Sunday. Grachi took a 2-week break from July 22, 2013, to August 2, 2013. The show started airing again on August 5 and ended on September 11, 2013, with the finale extending 20 more minutes. As of October 2014, Nickelodeon has no plans to air Season 3, and the show is instead replaced by its American adaptation, Every Witch Way.

References

 
Spanish-language television programming in the United States
Spanish-language television shows
2011 American television series debuts
2013 American television series endings
Television series about teenagers
Television shows set in Miami
Television shows filmed in Miami
Spanish-language telenovelas
American telenovelas
Children's telenovelas
Nickelodeon telenovelas
Witchcraft in television
Spanish-language Nickelodeon original programming